Arroyo High School, located in El Monte, California, United States, is a school in the El Monte Union High School District. The attendance area served by Arroyo High School consists of four different communities:  El Monte, Temple City, Arcadia, and an unincorporated area of Los Angeles County.

History
Arroyo High School opened its doors in 1955 and its first graduating class was the class of 1958.

Athletics 
Arroyo's main rival is Rosemead High School.

In 1987, Arroyo won the California State Division I Boys Cross-Country championship.

In 2016, Arroyo's football program won its second CIF (California Interscholastic Federation) - Southern Section championship in Division 12.

In 2019, Arroyo’s Varsity girl’s cross country team qualified for state for the first time in school history.

In 2019, Arroyo's baseball program won its first CIF championship against Marshall High School in Division 7.

The school colors are Columbia Blue, black, and white.

Academics
Foreign language classes offered at Arroyo High School include Spanish and Chinese.

As of 2022, AP and Pre-AP courses being offered at Arroyo High School include:

Biology
Calculus AB
Calculus BC
Chinese Language and Culture
Computer Science Principles
English Language and Composition
English Literature and Composition
Environmental Science
Physics 1: Algebra-Based
Psychology
Spanish Language and Culture
Spanish Literature and Culture
United States History
United States Government and Politics
World History
Pre-AP Biology
Pre-AP English 1
Pre-AP World History and Geography

Notable alumni 
 Rob Bottin, special effects make-up artist, class of 1977 
 Alexandra Hay, actress 
 Laura Molina, Chicana artist, actress and musician, class of 1976
 Steven Parent, aka "Stereo Steve", victim of the Charles Manson murders, class of 1969
 Kimberly Rhode double trap and skeet shooter, Olympic medalist winner and national champion, class of 1997
 Javier Vazquez (fighter), wrestler; retired mixed martial artist
 Jackie Warner, Former professional baseball player (California Angels)
 Bob Mackie, Fashion Designer
David Willman, Pulitzer Prize-winning journalist, class of 1974

References

External links
 Official Website
https://www.emuhsd.org/domain/216

High schools in Los Angeles County, California
Public high schools in California
El Monte, California
Educational institutions established in 1955
1955 establishments in California